Catocala paki is a moth in the family Erebidae first described by Yasunori Kishida in 1981. It is found in Korea.

References

paki
Moths described in 1981
Moths of Korea